The individual jumping competition at the 2006 FEI World Equestrian Games was held between August 29 and September 3, 2006.

Medalists

Complete results

Round 1
The first round of the individual jumping competition was held on August 29, 2006. It was a speed class.

Round 2

A
Part A of the second round of the individual jumping competition was held on August 30, 2006.

B
Part B of the second round of the individual jumping competition was held on August 31, 2006.

Grégory Wathelet withdrew prior to round 3, leaving the first reserve rider, Ricardo Jurado, with his spot. As a result, Wathelet finished the competition placed 26th overall.

Round 3

A
Part A of the third round of the individual jumping competition was held on September 2, 2006.

B
Part B of the third round of the individual jumping competition was held on September 2, 2006.

Final

Jump Off

References

External links
Official list of competitors
Official results
Round 1
Round 2A
Round 2B
Round 3A
Round 3B
Final

Jumping
World Equestrian Games Individual